The Universalist Church is a historic building located in Mitchellville, Iowa, United States. The congregation was organized in 1868 with a membership of thirty-five people. The first officers were: Thomas Mitchell, Moderator; Barlard Slate, Clerk; and Tillie Mitchell, Treasurer. The deacons were W.S. Jones, A. Rothrock and Pauline Weeks. Pastors included: W.W. King, T.C. Eaton, J.R. Sage, A. Vedder and F.W. Gillette. The church building was erected at a cost of $2,000. 

Built in 1868, it is the oldest documented building in Mitchellville. It is considered an "outstanding example of an early church design based on examples found in small New England towns." The building also served the town as its first school building. After the congregation disbanded they sold their property to the state of Iowa to use for weddings, funerals, and appropriate functions. The church building, along with two outhouses on the property, was listed on the National Register of Historic Places in 2005.

References

Religious organizations established in 1868
Churches completed in 1868
19th-century churches in the United States
Churches in Polk County, Iowa
Unitarian Universalist churches in Iowa
Churches on the National Register of Historic Places in Iowa
National Register of Historic Places in Polk County, Iowa
Universalist Church of America churches